South Africa competed at the World Games 2017  in Wroclaw, Poland, from 20 July 2017 to 30 July 2017.

Competitors

Archery
South Africa  has qualified at the 2017 World Games:

Men's Individual Compound - 1 quota (Riaan Crowther)

Gymnastic

Rhythmic Gymnastics
South Africa  has qualified at the 2017 World Games:

Women's individual event - 1 quota

Trampoline
South Africa has qualified at the 2017 World Games:

Men's Individual Double Mini Trampoline - 1 quota 
Women's Individual Tumbling - 1 quota

Tug of war 

South Africa won the bronze medal in the women's indoor 540 kg event.

References 

Nations at the 2017 World Games
2017 in South African sport
2017